RV Pacific Escort is a name used more than once by the U.S. Navy:

 , an Army tugboat acquired by the U.S. Navy in 1985 as an escort for submarines and as a for-hire oceanographic research ship at the Mare Island Naval Shipyard.
 , a  acquired by the U.S. Navy in 1965.

References 

United States Navy ship names